Of the four hundred New Deal murals depicting American Indian themes in the Sections program, only 24 were actually painted by American Indian artists.

1937
The Story of Natural Drugs, University of Illinois at Chicago Medical Center, Chicago, Illinois, Thomas Jefferson League, oil on Masonite, 5 panels. The panels illustrate the use of indigenous Native American remedies derived from  natural sources, by Spanish explorers in the New World.
Legends of Fernandino and Gabrileno Indians (1937), North Hollywood High School, Los Angeles, California, Fletcher Martin

Date needed
The Jicarilla Apache Trading Post, Carlsbad, New Mexico, La Verne Nelson Black (1887–1938)
Native Americans, University of New Mexico, Zimmerman Library, Kenneth Adams
Father LeMoyne Trying to Convert the Indians on Pathfinders Island, Fulton, New York, Caroline S. Rohland

Alabama

Alaska

Arizona

Arkansas

California

Colorado

Connecticut

Delaware

District of Columbia

Florida

Georgia

Hawaii

Idaho

Illinois

Indiana

Iowa

Kansas

Kentucky

Louisiana

Maine

Maryland

Massachusetts

Michigan

Minnesota

Mississippi

Missouri

Montana

Nebraska

Nevada

New Hampshire

New Jersey

New Mexico

New York

North Carolina

North Dakota

Ohio

Oklahoma

Oregon

Pennsylvania

Puerto Rico

Rhode Island

South Carolina

South Dakota

Tennessee

Texas

Utah

Vermont

Virgin Islands

Virginia

Washington

Wisconsin

Wyoming

References

Murals in the United States
Murals
Murals
Lists of public art in the United States